Roberto Beccantini (born 20 December 1950 in Bologna) is an Italian sports journalist.

He started writing for Tuttosport on 20 August 1970. On 1 March 1981, Beccantini transferred to La Gazzetta dello Sport. He was head of the department for international football of La Gazzetta dello Sport. He switched to La Stampa on 1 February 1992. Beccantini was one of the first journalists who reported on the 2006 Italian football scandal. In 2011, he won the Nando Martellini journalism award.

Authored books

References

External links 
 Biography of Roberto Beccantini

1950 births
Living people
Italian sportswriters
Italian sports journalists